Deer Isle is an island in Hancock County, Maine, United States. There are two communities on the island, Deer Isle and Stonington.  It is on the eastern side of Penobscot Bay, connected by road to the Maine mainland through Little Deer Isle.  Its only vehicular connection to the mainland is State Route 15 over Deer Isle Bridge.

Geography 
The town is separated from the mainland by Eggemoggin Reach and may be reached by car via Deer Isle Bridge. The town includes other nearby islands, including Little Deer Isle.

Located on the southern end of Deer Isle, Stonington is situated in Penobscot Bay and the Gulf of Maine, part of the Atlantic Ocean. Stonington is the terminus of Maine State Route 15, which passes through the town of Deer Isle and across the Deer Isle Bridge to the mainland.

See also 
List of islands of Maine
List of islands of the United States by area

References 

Islands of Hancock County, Maine
Islands of Maine
Coastal islands of Maine